Sean Rabbitt (born April 8, 1990) is an American retired figure skater. He is the 2015 Autumn Classic International bronze medalist.

Programs

Competitive highlights 
CS: Challenger Series

Senior career

Juvenile to junior career

Detailed results
Small medals for short and free programs awarded only at ISU Championships. Pewter medals for fourth-place finishes awarded only at U.S. national and regional events. At team events, medals awarded for team results only.

Senior career

References

External links 
 

1990 births
American male single skaters
Living people
People from Orange, California